The 2008 Indy Japan 300 was the third round of the 2008 IndyCar Series season, for drivers who competed in the series in 2007 and teams that had entered for 2008 who were not former Champ Car teams that were in transition. This was because the 2008 Toyota Grand Prix of Long Beach occurred on the same weekend and there was no way of changing dates to avoid the clash when the reunification took place. Originally scheduled for the afternoon of April 19, 2008 at the  Twin Ring Motegi in Motegi, Tochigi, the race was delayed by 22 hours until the morning of April 20, due to water seeping up onto the track from previous heavy rains. Danica Patrick won the race, becoming the first female winner in the history of top-level American open-wheel racing.

Qualifying
Due to rain in the Tochigi region, qualifying was cancelled and the field was set by driver points. Thus, the grid was:

Race

References 

Indy Japan 300
Indy Japan 300
Indy Japan 300